Volt Ukaine (abbreviated Volt) is a social-liberal political party in Ukraine. It is the Ukrainian branch of Volt Europa, a political movement that operates on a European level.

Foundation
Volt Ukraine was founded in July 2022 by Mykhaylo Pobigay, who also serves as chairman. In a post on Volt's website, Pobigay said:

See also

 List of pro-European political parties

References

Political parties in Ukraine
Social liberal parties
Progressive parties
Political parties established in 2022
Pro-European political parties in Ukraine
Ukraine